Icaria, also spelled Ikaria, is a Greek island in the Aegean Sea, 10 nautical miles (19 km) southwest of Samos. According to tradition, it derives its name from Icarus, the son of Daedalus in Greek mythology, who was believed to have fallen into the sea nearby.

Administratively, Icaria forms a separate municipality within the Ikaria regional unit, which is part of the North Aegean region. The principal town of the island and seat of the municipality is Agios Kirykos. The historic capitals of the island include Oenoe and Evdilos.

Geography

The topography is a contrast between verdant slopes and barren steep rocks. The island is mountainous for the most part. Most of its villages are nestled in the plains near the coast, with some in the mountains.

Icaria has a tradition of producing strong red wine. Many parts of the island, especially the ravines, are covered in shrubbery, making the landscape lush with green. Aside from domestic and domesticated species such as goats, there are a number of small wild animals to be found, such as martens, European otters, jumping spiders, and green toads. Icaria exhibits a typical Mediterranean climate.

History

Icaria has been inhabited since at least 7000 BC, when it was populated by the Neolithic Pelasgians, a blanket term used by the ancient Greeks to refer to all pre-Hellenic peoples inhabiting the Greek region. Around 750 BC, Greeks from Miletus colonized Icaria, establishing a settlement in the area of present-day Campos, which later became the ancient capital city of Oenoe. In antiquity, the island was called Icaria or Ikaria, as today; and also Icarus or Ikaros (Ἴκαρος).

Antiquity
Icaria became part of the sea empire of Polycrates during the 6th century BC, and during the 5th century BC, the Icarian cities of Oenoe and Thermae were members of the Athenian-dominated Delian League. During the 2nd century, the island was colonized by Samos. At this time, the Tauropolion, the temple of Artemis was built at Oenoe.

Coins of the city represented Artemis and a bull. There was another, smaller temenos that was sacred to Artemis Tauropolos, at Nas, on the northwest coast of the island.

The sea around Icaria had a fearsome reputation among the Ancients. Homer likened its changeability to a crowd stirred by demagogy: "the gathering was stirred like the long sea-waves of the Icarian main, which the East Wind or the South Wind has raised, rushing upon them from the clouds of father Zeus" (Iliad II, 145), and Horace, too, in the opening of his Odes associates "the African winds as they fight the Icarian waves" with shattered ships (Odes I.i.15–6). The island itself had two associative descriptive epithets: ‘Dolichi' (elongated) and ‘Ichtheoussa' (rich in fish). The name may originally have come from the Phoenician word for fish, ‘ikor', rather than from associations with the mythical Icarus, whose fall was likely associated with the ancient deme of Icaria or Icarion in Attica.

In the later Fabulae ("stories") of Hyginus the Greek versions of myth associated with Melanippe (otherwise Arne) and her sons Boeotus and Aeolus by Poseidon are amended to relate the story of Theano (otherwise Autolyte), wife of Metapontus, a king of Icaria. Metapontus demanded that she bear him children, or leave the kingdom. She presented the exposed twin sons of Melanippe by Neptune to her husband, as if they were her own. Later Theano bore him two sons of her own and, wishing to leave the kingdom to her own children, sent them to kill Melanippe's while out hunting. In the fight that ensued, her two sons were killed, and she committed suicide upon hearing the news. Metapontus later married Melanippe and her two sons founded towns in Propontis called by their names — Boeotia and Aeolia.

Temple of Artemis at Nas
Nas had been a sacred spot to the pre-Hellenic inhabitants of the Aegean, and Nas was an important island port in antiquity, the last stop before testing the dangerous seas around Icaria. It was an appropriate location for sailors to make sacrifices to Artemis Tauropolos, who was a patron of seafarers; here, the goddess was represented in an archaic wooden xoanon.

The temple stood in good repair until the middle of the 19th century when the marble was pillaged, for their local church, by the Kato Raches villagers. In 1939, this church was excavated by the Greek archeologist Leon Politis. During the Axis occupation of Greece during World War II, many of the artifacts that were unearthed by Politis disappeared. Local tales state that the Germans and Italians stole the artifacts. According to local legend, marble artefacts from the temple still lie under the sand of the Nas beach where the temple stood.

In The Anabasis of Alexander, the second-century Greek historian Arrian recorded Aristobulus as saying that Alexander the Great had ordered that Failaka Island in the Persian Gulf should be called Icarus, after Icaria in the Aegean Sea.

Medieval Era
In the 14th century CE, Icaria was part of the Republic of Genoa's possessions in the Aegean. At some point during this period the Icarians destroyed their own ports to prevent the landing of unwanted visitors. According to local historians, the Icarians, based on their own designs, built seven watchtowers along the coastlines. Once an unknown or enemy vessel appeared, the observers would at once light a fire at the top and run to a tank which was always filled with water. A wooden plug located at the base was pulled, and water would flow. The guards of the other watchtowers were alerted by the fire and repeated the process. In the inner side of each tower's tank are marks identical to the ones measuring volumes in flasks. Each one of these marks was labelled with a different message on it, such as "pirate attack" or "unknown ship approaching". Once the water level reached the mark signifying the appropriate message, the messengers would place the plug back on the tank and put out the fire, so that each of the other towers could decode the size and gravity of the incoming danger. The watchtowers on the island's heights, such as the one in Drakano, were part of the islands' communication network since the time of the Delian League.

At the same time the Icarians rarely built their houses in the form prevalent today. Each house was low, had a single room, a roof of stone slabs, and was distant from neighbouring ones. It had a single low door and the sea-facing side was protected with tall walls, while there was an opening on the roof (locally called the Anefantis). Because a chimney with smoke could betray the house's location, it was often sealed. Smoke was poured through the roof slabs without being visible, while simultaneously clearing the wooden roof supports of insects. Rooms featured the bare necessities, such as a grinding stone and a cauldron. Traditionally, people would sleep on the floor and hide their belongings in the walls. Men and women wore almost the same clothing: sewn woollen skirts for women, a type of fustanella for the men. Later on the vest came to be worn by men and women. This frugal way of living contributed to the famed Icarian longevity and the absence of distinct social classes. Each house was self-sufficient, using the living space around it for the cultivation of the necessary things, women contributed in work and social life. Villages were slowly created by descendants of an original family which gradually spread. Despite the sparse population, societal integrity was large. There were the panigiria (traditional festivals featuring dances, music and consumption of local products), team labor and elder councils who would take the decisions. This unique way of life and architecture was preserved until the end of the 19th century, with many elements surviving until today.

Knights Hospitalier - Ottoman Era
The Knights of St. John, who had their base in Rhodes, exerted some control over Icaria until 1521, when the Ottoman Empire incorporated Icaria into its realm. It was at this time that the problem of piracy reached new heights, where the islanders embraced the tactic of invisibility: they retreated to the island's highlands, hiding their villages and homes. For defence against pirates, aside from this tactic (sparse habitation and hiding of residences) there were watchtowers, various points of concentration and defence (such as plateaus invisible from the sea) and communal hidden supplies to be used in time of need. Their theft was punishable even by death according to the common law of the time. Locals were reported attacking any unwanted visitors on their coastlines, even shipwrecked sailors.

The Icarians lynched the first Turkish tax collector but managed to escape punishment. The oral story in regards to the event talks of an Ottoman Aga, who demanded two locals to carry him on their shoulders atop a seat. The carriers, unable to accept the forcefulness, threw him off a cliff in the Kako Katavasidi area. The Turkish authorities rounded up the population and demanded to know who the perpetrator was, but the answer they received according to legend was "all of us, milord". The Turks realistically determined that there was neither profit nor honour in punishing all.

The Ottomans imposed a very loose administration, not sending any officials to Icaria for several centuries, although in later years they would appoint groups of locals in each village of the island to act as Kodjabashis in order to collect taxes for the empire. The best account that we have of the island during the early years of the Ottoman rule is from the Archbishop J. Georgirenes, who in 1677 described the island as having almost 1,000 hardy, long-lived inhabitants, who were the poorest people in the Aegean.

Without a decent port —the local population destroyed the island's ports long ago to protect themselves from pirate raids— Icaria depended for its very limited intercourse with the outside world upon small craft that were drawn up on the beaches. Icarian boat-makers had a good reputation for building boats from the island's fir forests. Then they sold boats and lumber for coin and grain in nearby Chios. The inshore waters of the island, as told by Georgirenes, provided the best cockle shellfish in the archipelago. Over the centuries, Ikaria would also become renowned for its charcoal, which became known as Carbon Cariot (Ikarian Charcoal).

Goats and sheep roamed virtually untended in the rocky landscape. Cheeses were made for consumption in every household. Icaria in the 17th century was unusual in the archipelago in not producing any wine for export. The people kept barrels of the wine for their own drinking. They also continued to store it in the old-fashioned way prevalent since the Bronze Age, in terracotta pithoi containers sunk to their rims in earth, thus protecting their supplies from both tax collectors and pirates.

Apart from three small towns, none of which exceeded 100 houses, and numerous village settlements, each house had a walled orchard and a garden plot. Unlike the closely built towns of Samos, the hardy inhabitants lived separately in fortified unfurnished farmsteads.

In 1827, during the Greek War of Independence, Icaria broke away from the Ottoman Empire, but was not included in the narrow territory of the original independent Greece, and it was forced to accept Ottoman rule once more a few years later.

Free State of Icaria

Icaria remained part of the Ottoman Empire until 17 July 1912, when the Icarians expelled the Turkish garrison and thereby achieved independence. After its independence and the outbreak of the First Balkan War, Icaria's sole "warship", the Cleopatra, was used to provide food and supplies to the islands of Samos and Chios, which were captured by the Greek Navy during the war.

George N. Spanos (c. 1872–1912) of Evdilos, killed in a Turkish ambush on 17 July 1912, is honoured as the hero of the Icarian Revolution. His bust, depicting him defiantly, with bandoliers on his body and rifle in hand, may be seen at the memorial established in his honour at the site of his death located in the Icarian town of Chrysostomos.

On 18 July 1912, the Free State of Icaria (Ελευθέρα Πολιτεία Ικαρίας, Elefthéra Politía Ikarías) was declared. The neighboring islands of Fournoi Korseon were also liberated and became part of the Free State. Ioannis Malachias (Ιωάννης Μαλαχίας) was the first and only president of the Free State of Icaria.

For five months, it remained an independent country, with its own government, armed forces, national flag, coat of arms, postage stamps, and national anthem. These five months were difficult for the island's economy. There were food shortages and they were at risk of becoming part of the Italian Dodecanese. On 4 November 1912, after a delay due to the Balkan Wars, Icaria officially became part of the Kingdom of Greece. The Ottoman Empire recognized Greece's annexation of Icaria and the other Aegean islands in the Treaty of London (1913).

Second World War

The island suffered losses in property and lives during the Second World War as the result of the Italian and then German occupation. There are no exact figures on how many people starved, but in the village of Karavostamo alone over 100 perished from starvation.

"Red Rock"
After the ravages of the war the nationalists and communists fought in the Greek Civil War (1946–49), and the Greek government used the island to exile about 13,000 communists. To this date, the majority of the locals have remained sympathetic to left parties and communism, and, for this reason, Icaria is referred to by some as the "Red Rock" (Κόκκινος Βράχος, Kokkinos Vrahos).

In his analysis, "Rebels and Radicals; Icaria 1600–2000", historian Anthony J. Papalas (East Carolina University) examines modern Icaria in the light of such 20th-century questions as poverty, emigration to America, the nature of the Axis occupation, the rise of Communism, the Greek Civil War, and the rightwing reaction to radical postwar movements.

Modern era
The quality of life improved greatly after 1960, when the Greek government began to invest in the infrastructure of the island to assist in the promotion of tourism. Today, Icaria is considered one of the world's five "Blue zones" – places where the population regularly lives to an advanced age (one in three make it to their 90s). This is due to healthy diet, lifestyle, and genetics. The Ikaria Study, published in 2011, sought to understand the factors that contributed to longevity.

Demographics
The inhabitants of the island are known as Icarians or Icariots. (Ikariótes).

An Icarian diaspora is found throughout Greece, specifically on Thimena and Fournoi Korseon, as well as in Athens, where a large community is found. The people of Icarian diaspora can be found throughout the world, mainly in Australia, the United States, Canada, Egypt and the United Kingdom.

Icarian Greeks are closely related to other Aegean island Greeks, such as Greeks from Samos, Chios, Fournoi Korseon, and Patmos, as well as Greeks from Anatolia.

Municipality

The present municipality Ikaria was formed in the 2011 local government reform by the merger of the following three former municipalities, that became municipal units:
 Agios Kirykos
 Evdilos
 Raches

Subdivisions
The municipal units Agios Kirykos, Evdilos and Raches are subdivided into the following communities (constituent villages in brackets):

Agios Kirykos
 Agios Kirykos (Agios Kirykos, Therma Ikarias, Katafygio, Lardades, Mavrato, Koundouma, Mavrikato, Xylosyrtis, Oxea, Tsouredes, Faros)
 Perdiki (Perdiki, Kioni, Mileopo, Monokampi, Ploumari)
 Chrysostomos (Chrysostomos, Vardarades, Vaoni, Livadi, Plagia)

Evdilos
 Evdilos (Evdilos, Kambos, Agia Kyriaki, Droutsoulas, Kerameio, Kyparissi, Xanthi, Fytema)
 Arethousa (Arethousa, Kyparissi, Pera Arethousa, Foinikas)
 Dafni (Dafni, Akamatra, Kosoikia, Petropouli, Steli)
 Karavostamo
 Manganitis (Manganitis, Kalamonari)
 Frantato (Frantato, Avlaki, Kalamourida, Kampos, Kremasti, Maratho, Pigi, Stavlos)

Raches
 Raches (Christos, Agios Dimitrios, Armenistis, Vrakades, Kares, Nas or
Kato Raches, Kouniadoi, Mavriannos, Nanouras, Xinta, Proespera, Profitis Ilias, Tsakades) 
 Agios Polykarpos (Agios Polykarpos, Agios Panteleimonas, Gialiskari, Kastanies, Lapsachades, Lomvardades, Mandria)
 Karkinagri (Karkinagri, Amalo, Kalamos, Lagkada, Pezi, Trapalo)

Museums

Archeological Museum of Kampos
The Archaeological Museum, located in the village of Kambos, stands on a hill which was once the ancient fortress of Oinoe, and is immediately next to Agia Irini, Ikaria's oldest church. The museum contains over 250 artifacts, including Neolithic tools, pottery vessels, clay statuettes, columns, coins, and carved headstones.

Archeological Museum of Agios Kirikos
Housed in the former lycee of Agios Kirikos, which was built by immigrant Ikarians living in America, the recently renovated neoclassical building dating to 1925 is the home of Ikaria's Archeological Museum . This listed building will house all of Ikaria's most relevant finds and highlight the history and culture of the island in the facilities of a modern museum and research/conservation center.

Complete with multimedia displays and films dedicated to the Myth of Ikaros and the ancient citadel of Drakano, the museum presents Ikaria's archeological findings and relates to the visitor an understanding of the cultural, commercial and social development of the settlements of ancient Ikaria throughout the course of the island's history.

Folk & Historical Museum Of Agios Kirikos
Located in Agios Kirikos, The Folk & History Museum of Agios Kirikos in Ikaria was launched in July 2010, and is the result of the long efforts by Professor Themistocles Katsaros. Its mission is to preserve and promote Ikarian folklore, traditions and customs through its display of over 1,500 objects that reflect the history and heritage of Ikaria and its inhabitants.
The museum exhibits items of cultural importance from the island, including dresses, textiles, household articles, pottery, agriculture and trade tools & instruments, photos, documents and many other objects.

Of particular interest amongst the items displayed in the museum is the flag of the Free State of Ikaria (1912). 
Some of the exhibits have been organised thematically and chronologically, so that objects and images give visitors an idea of social and economic life in Ikaria from the 18th century to the 1970s, when traditional life still continued in the region.

Folklore Museum Of Vrakades
The Folklore Museum of Vrakades is located in the scenic village of Vrakades, 650 meters above sea level on the north-western side of the island. The village was founded in the 17th century and contains old stone houses and captains' villas of architectural note. The museum houses an interesting collection of items related to the history and people of the region. Of particular interest are documents and memorabilia from the Free State of Ikaria.

Other exhibits include various clay and wooden objects used by housewives, beekeepers, and farmers, ecclesiastical relics from Profit Elias in Vrakades and the convent of Evagelistrias Mavrianou, books by Ikarian writers, Ikarian records and documents over 500 years old. Of note is the cutter, "lanari" in Greek, used for the processing of wool and goat hairs from which the modest local clothing was made, the "lisgos", a simple tool used for making ropes, an old digging tool, and many other tools belonging to the first inhabitants of the island.

Notable people connected with Icaria
 Eleftheria Arvanitaki (born 1957), singer, originates from Icaria
 Ioannis Malachias, (1880–1958), first and only President of the Free State of Ikaria
 Aristides Phoutrides (1887–1927), Harvard professor of classical philology
 Aris Poulianos (born 1924), anthropologist, born in Icaria
 Zack Space (born 1961), American politician, family originates from Icaria
 Christodoulos I. Stefanadis (born 1947) professor of cardiology, born on Icaria
 Christodoulos Xiros, (born 1958), Greek terrorist (member of November 17 terrorist group)
 Anthony Maras, Greek Australian film director
 Chris Kourakis, Chief justice of South Australia
 Mikis Theodorakis, lived in exile on the island 
 Nick Mamatas, American author, family originates from Icaria
 Yorgos Lanthimos, Greek film director. His grandmother is from Icaria.
 Elena Carapetis, Australian actress. Her father's family originates in Icaria.
 Dean Karnazes, American ultramarathon runner and author. His mother's family originates from Icaria.
 Stephan Pastis, American cartoonist
 Alex Carapetis, Australian musician 
 Jonathan Carapetis, Australian paediatric physician. His father is from Ikaria.
 Theo Maras, Greek-Australian property mogul
 Nik Chapley, Greek-Australian businessman and Foodland owner
 John Chapley, Greek-Australian businessman and Foodland owner
Niki Vasilakis, Greek-Australian violinist
George V. Spanos, judge of the California Superior Court, his father was born on Icaria
 Nicholas Ikaris, sculptor

See also
 Pan-Icarian Brotherhood

References

External links

 "The Island Where People Forget to Die" by Dan Buettner, The New York Times, October 24, 2012

 
Blue zones
Milesian colonies
Municipalities of the North Aegean
Islands of Greece
Landforms of Ikaria (regional unit)
Islands of the North Aegean
Members of the Delian League
Former countries in Europe
Locations in Greek mythology
Populated places in Ikaria (regional unit)